Robert Dale Lewis (born July 28, 1952) is a Canadian former professional ice hockey player. He played eight games in the National Hockey League with the New York Rangers during the 1975–76 NHL season.

External links

1952 births
Living people
Canadian ice hockey left wingers
New Haven Nighthawks players
New York Rangers players
Ice hockey people from Edmonton
Suncoast Suns (EHL) players
Undrafted National Hockey League players
Vancouver Nats players